Plaine (German: Blen) is a commune in the Bas-Rhin department in Grand Est in northeastern France. Five hamlets belong to the commune (Diespach, Poutay, Champenay, Le Bambois and Devant Fouday).

See also
 Communes of the Bas-Rhin department

References

Communes of Bas-Rhin
Bas-Rhin communes articles needing translation from French Wikipedia
Salm-Salm